Campo della Salute is a city square in Dorsoduro, Venice, Italy.

Buildings around the square
 Punta della Dogana
 Santa Maria della Salute

Piazzas and campos in Venice